Shree Jain Vidyalaya, Kolkata (Hindi: श्री जैन विद्यालय), often abbreviated SJV, is a school for secondary and senior secondary education located in Burrabazar region of Kolkata. The school is affiliated to the State Boards WBBSE and WBCHSE and more than 2900 pupils are enrolled in it.

The school was founded in 1934 by Phushraj Bacchwat in whose honor the address of the school was renamed from Sukeas Lane to Phusraj Bachhawat Path. In year 2009, the school celebrated its Platinum Jubilee on completion of 75 years. Notable guests of the event included alumni Pawan Kumar Goenka, head of Mahindra's Automotive Division.The school currently has no principal.Sanjay kumar Pandey who was the former teacher and even student of shree jain vidyalaya is the headmaster of the school.

References

External links
 Official website
 (Secondary)

Jain education
Primary schools in West Bengal
High schools and secondary schools in West Bengal
Schools in Kolkata
Educational institutions established in 1934
1934 establishments in India